Anna Marie Hahn (born Filser; July 7, 1906 – December 7, 1938) was a German-born American serial killer.

Biography

Early life
Anna Hahn was the youngest of twelve children though five of her siblings had died by the time Anna was born. Her father, George Filser, was a furniture manufacturer, and the family was considered to be well-off financially.

At age 19, she became pregnant with her son Oskar, and told her family that the father was a Viennese physician, Dr. Max Matscheki, a well-known cancer researcher. However, no record of a Dr. Matscheki has ever been found; to this day, the identity of Oskar's real father is unknown. Hahn's scandalized family sent her to the U.S. in 1929, while her son remained in Bavaria with her parents. While staying with relatives Max and Anna Doeschel in Cincinnati, Ohio, Hahn met fellow German immigrant Philip Hahn; they married in 1930. Hahn briefly returned to Germany to retrieve Oskar, then she and her husband started a family.

Murders
Hahn allegedly began poisoning and robbing elderly men in Cincinnati's German community to support her gambling habit. Ernst Kohler, who died on May 6, 1933, was believed to be her first victim. Hahn had befriended him shortly before his death. He left her a house in his will.

Her next alleged victim, Albert Parker, 72, also died soon after she began caring for him. Prior to Parker's death, she signed an I.O.U. for $1,000 that she borrowed from him, but after his death, the document was either discarded or simply "disappeared". Jacob Wagner, 78, died on June 3, 1937, leaving $17,000 cash to his "beloved niece" Hahn. She soon began caring for 67-year-old George Gsellman, also of Cincinnati. For her service before his death on July 6, 1937, she received $17,000.

Hahn killed her last victim, Georg Obendoerfer, on August 1, 1937, after he traveled to Colorado Springs, Colorado, with her and her son. Police said that Obendoerfer, a cobbler, "died in agony just after Mrs. Hahn had bent over his deathbed inquiring his name, professing she did not know the man". Hahn's son testified at her trial that he, his mother, and Obendoerfer traveled to Colorado by train from Cincinnati together and that Obendoerfer began getting sick en route.

Investigation 
An autopsy revealed high levels of arsenic in Obendoerfer's body, which aroused police suspicions. Exhumations of two of her previous clients revealed that they had been poisoned. Hahn was a prime suspect, and was soon arrested.

Hahn was convicted after a four-week trial in November 1937. Sentenced to death, she went to the electric chair at the Ohio Penitentiary in Columbus on December 7, 1938. She was buried in Mount Calvary Cemetery in Columbus.

See also 
 List of serial killers in the United States

References

Further reading
 
 "Anna Marie Hahn", Mind of a Killer (DVD), Kozel Multimedia, 1998.
 Peter Vronsky: Female Serial Killers: How and Why Women Become Monsters, Berkley Books, New York (2007), p. 441

1906 births
1933 murders in the United States
1938 deaths
20th-century executions by Ohio
20th-century executions of American people
Burials at Mount Calvary Cemetery (Columbus, Ohio)
Executed American female serial killers
Executed German female serial killers
Executed people from Bavaria
German emigrants to the United States
German people executed abroad
People executed by Ohio by electric chair
Poisoners
Violence against men in North America